Chryseobacterium bernardetii  is a bacterium from the genus of Chryseobacterium.

References

Further reading

External links
Type strain of Chryseobacterium bernardetii at BacDive -  the Bacterial Diversity Metadatabase

bernardetii
Bacteria described in 2013